Tours Val de Loire Airport  is an airport in the French department of Indre-et-Loire,  north-northeast of the city of Tours in the Loire Valley (Val de Loire). The airport is located partly on the territory of the communes of Tours and Parçay-Meslay.

The airport is open to both national and international carriers, private planes and is certified for both instrument flight and visual flight.

History
The airport dates back to World War I, being established as a French Air Force (Armee de l'Air) training center.  The center trained many French aviators and some Americans who had volunteered prior to the American entry in the war into the French flying service.  In the summer of 1917, the school was provided to the American Expeditionary Forces, which designated the school as the Second Aviation Instructional Center, Tours Aerodrome.  Initially it was used as an advanced training school for pursuit pilot combat training.  Later it developed into a center of training for all aerial observers of the Air Service, United States Army assigned to the AEF. It also was used as a radio school, a photographic school and an aerial gunnery school.  After the 1918 Armistice with Germany, it was returned to the French Air Force which used it as a military base.

After World War II the airport was used by NATO and the US Air Force before becoming a flying school in the 1950s. From the early 1960s, Tours Airport was opened to the public. During the end of the 1970s the airport enjoyed a golden period due to the local airline Touraine Air Transport (TAT), but that airline suffered a slow slump, from which the airport never really recovered until the late 1990s, when it received subventions by the Conseil Général.

Facilities
It has one paved runway designated 02/20 which measures . The airport once housed the head office of TAT European Airlines.

There is no longer a shuttle service to the airport, it is not served by the Fil Bleu city bus service, and the tramway stops around a kilometre away from it.

Airlines and destinations
The following airlines operate regular scheduled and charter flights at Tours Val de Loire Airport:

Statistics

References

External links 
 Tours Val de Loire Airport, official website in French
  Aéroport de Tours – Val-de-Loire at Union des Aéroports Français
 

Airports in Centre-Val de Loire
Buildings and structures in Indre-et-Loire
Transport in Centre-Val de Loire